Mirabad (also Romanized as Mīrābād) is a village in Zamkan Rural District, in Zamkan district, it is central area in the Zamkan District  (Salas-e Babajani County)|Zamkan District]] of Salas-e Babajani County, Kermanshah Province, Iran. At the 2006 census, its population was 1,069, in 235 families.

References 

Populated places in Salas-e Babajani County